Ed Sanders is a poet, singer, social activist, environmentalist, novelist and publisher.

Edward or Ed Sanders may also refer to:

 Ed Sanders (TV personality) (born 1968), carpenter who appears in Extreme Makeover: Home Edition
 Ed Sanders (boxer) (1930–1954), Olympic gold medalist in boxing
 Ed Sanders (actor) (born 1993), English actor, singer and record producer
 Edward Sanders (politician) (1888–1943), member of the New South Wales Legislative Assembly
 E. P. Sanders (born 1937), New Testament scholar
 The original name given to the fictional character Winnie-the-Pooh